The Lo-100 is an aerobatic glider of classic wood and fabric construction well suited to amateur building methods. The designation Lo was bestowed by the designer Alfred Vogt in memory of his brother Lothar Vogt, with whom he had developed the predecessor model Lo-105 Zwergreiher ('dwarf heron'). The first flight of the prototype took place in 1952 at the Klippeneck.
An example is on display at the Gliding Heritage Centre.

The single-piece wing has a main spar built from laminated beechwood in order to achieve the strength needed for aerobatics. The glider has no spoilers and must be landed using side-slip.

Specifications

See also

Notes

References

Further reading
Dietmar Geistmann, Die Segelflugzeuge in Deutschland, 
Georg Brütting, Die berühmtesten Segelflugzeuge,  
Martin Simons, Sailplanes, Vol. 2 1945-1965, EQIP
Peter Mallinson and Mike Woollard, Handbook of Glider Aerobatics
Eric Müller, Upside Down Faszination und Technik des Kunstflugs,

External links 

Sailplane Directory
Lo-100 "Alfred Vogt" (German language)
Alfred Vogt, Lo-100 Memories of the development (German language)
Dusseldorf airshow Lo-100 display and crash

1950s German sailplanes
Glider aircraft
Aircraft first flown in 1952